There are two churches in Palermo dedicated to Saint Anne:
 Sant'Anna la Misericordia located in the quarter of Kalsa
 Sant'Anna al Capo located in the quarter of Seralcadi, near the Mercato del Capo